Gowri Kirubanandan is a Tamil writer known for her Telugu - Tamil translation works. She won Sahitya Akademi Translation Prize in 2015 for her translation of Telugu novel Vimuktha, by Volka into Tamil, titled Meetchi.

Early life 
Kirubanandan was born on 2 September 1956 in Dindigul, Tamil Nadu to Krishnamoorthy and Rajalakshmi. She was raised and graduated in Andhra pradesh. After her marriage, she came back to Tamil Nadu in 1976.

Works 
So far she has translated 70 Telugu novels and 50 Telugu short stories into Tamil, including Yandamuri Veerendranath's novel Antharmukam. She also translated works of well known writers like Jayakanthan, Ashokamitran, Thoppil Mohamed Meeran, Nanjil Nadan and Neela Padmanabhan from Tamil to Telugu. She translated Prapanchan’s Vaanam Vasappadum and Ku. Alagirisami’s Anbalippu from Tamil to Telugu.

Awards 
 2015 Sahitya Akademi Translation Prize
 2016 Sparrow Literary Awards

References 

Living people
Tamil-language writers
Recipients of the Sahitya Akademi Award in Tamil
1956 births
Recipients of the Sahitya Akademi Prize for Translation